Ezekiel 16 is the sixteenth chapter of the Book of Ezekiel in the Hebrew Bible or the Old Testament of the Christian Bible. This book contains prophecies attributed to the prophet/priest Ezekiel, and is one of the Books of the Prophets. Biblical scholar R. E. Clements calls this chapter "an Old Testament parable of the prodigal daughter", describing a shocking illustration of ungrateful Jerusalem in contrast to God's enduring love to her. This chapter is often linked to Ezekiel 23, which deals with two daughters, symbolizing the Kingdoms of Israel and Judah.

Text
The original text was written in the Hebrew language. This chapter is divided into 63 verses.

Textual witnesses
Some early manuscripts containing the text of this chapter in Hebrew are of the Masoretic Text tradition, which includes the Codex Cairensis (895), the Petersburg Codex of the Prophets (916), Aleppo Codex (10th century), and Codex Leningradensis (1008). Fragments containing parts of this chapter in Hebrew were found among the Dead Sea Scrolls, that is, 3Q1 (3QEzek; 50 BCE–50 CE) with extant verses 31–33.

There is also a translation into Koine Greek known as the Septuagint, made in the last few centuries BC. Extant ancient manuscripts of the Septuagint version include Codex Vaticanus (B; B; 4th century), Codex Alexandrinus (A; A; 5th century) and Codex Marchalianus (Q; Q; 6th century).

Verse 2
 Son of man, cause Jerusalem to know her abominations,
 "Son of man" (Hebrew: בן־אדם -): this phrase is used 93 times to address Ezekiel. 
 "Abomination" (Hebrew: תּוֹעֵבָה ): something loathsome or objectionable, especially for "Jehovah", "specially used for things belonging to the worship of idols" or idolatrous practices and objects.

Verse 3
 And say, Thus saith the Lord God unto Jerusalem;
 Thy birth and thy nativity is of the land of Canaan;
 thy father was an Amorite, and thy mother an Hittite.
God "commands Ezekiel to inform Jerusalem of the accusation brought against her, and in verses 3—34 provides a 'biography' for his bride". The assimilation of Israel with those former residents [of the land of Israel] led to apostasy.

Verse 6

 And when I passed by thee, and saw thee polluted in thine own blood,
 I said unto thee when thou wast in thy blood,
  Live; yea, I said unto thee when thou wast in thy blood, Live.
 "Polluted" (Hebrew: מִתְבּוֹסֶסֶת miṯ-bō-se-seṯ, from the root verb בּוּס , "tread down with feet" or "trample"): Rashi connects it to (numbered as 60:14 in Hebrew version): "God ... shall tread down (Hebrew: יָבוּס) our enemies."

Verse 16
Moreover you multiplied your acts of harlotry as far as the land of the trader, Chaldea; and even then you were not satisfied.
Chaldea: "the land of the trader" or "the land of merchants". The King James Version lacks the wording which describes Chaldea as a trading nation.

Verses 44-52
An unfavourable comparison of Jerusalem to Samaria and Sodom.

Verses 59-63
God promises at last to forgive Jerusalem.

Verse 60
 Nevertheless I will remember my covenant with thee in the days of thy youth,
 and I will establish unto thee an everlasting covenant.

See also
 Amorites
 Assyria
 Canaan
 Chaldea
 Egypt
 Hittites
 Jerusalem
 Philistine
 Rape in the Hebrew Bible § Ezekiel 16 and 23
 Samaria
 Sodom

Related Bible parts: Genesis 14, Leviticus 26, Isaiah 47, Ezekiel 23, John 15, Revelation 17

Notes

References

Bibliography

External links

Jewish
Ezekiel 16 Hebrew with Parallel English
Ezekiel 16 Hebrew with Rashi's Commentary

Christian
Ezekiel 16 English Translation with Parallel Latin Vulgate

16